The 16th congressional district of Missouri was a congressional district for the United States House of Representatives in Missouri from 1903 to 1933.

List of members representing the district

References 
 Election Statistics 1920-present Clerk of the House of Representatives

 Congressional Biographical Directory of the United States 1774–present

Former congressional districts of the United States
16
Constituencies established in 1903
1903 establishments in Missouri
Constituencies disestablished in 1933
1933 disestablishments in Missouri